Voo may refer to:

 VOO, a Belgian cable company
 Voo (crater), a crater on Mars
 VOO, an exchange-traded fund issued by the Vanguard Group which tracks the S&P 500
 Polish pronunciation of the letter W (usually written wu)

See also
 Vo0 (Sander Kaasjager, born 1985), Dutch esports player
 Voo Voo, a Polish jazz-rock band formed in 1985
 Voo Nocturno, a 2007 album by Jorge Palma
 Voodoo (disambiguation)